Lyefjell is a village in Time municipality in Rogaland county, Norway.

The village is a residential area that was built in the hills so that the flat, agricultural areas could continue to be used for farming.  It is just to the south of the mountain Njåfjellet and the village has views of the flat plains of Jæren below.

There is an elementary and middle school in Lyefjell as well as three large pre-schools. There is also a well stocked grocery store right next to the local auto shop. The grocery store also serves as a delivery point for packages for Posten and Postnord.

References

Villages in Rogaland
Time, Norway